Rossiya class is a class of Russian river passenger ships, project 785. "Rossiya" means "Russia" in Russian.
Two-deck cruise ships manufactured in Komárno, Czechoslovakia, 1952–1958. The shipyard's designation: OL800 (osobna lod - passenger motor ship 800 h.p.).

River cruise ships of the project 785 / OL800

Overview

See also
 List of river cruise ships
 Valerian Kuybyshev-class motorship
 Dmitriy Furmanov-class motorship
 Baykal-class motorship
 Anton Chekhov-class motorship
 Sergey Yesenin-class motorship
 Oktyabrskaya Revolyutsiya-class motorship
 Ukraina-class motorship
 Dunay-class motorship

References

External links

 Проект 785, 785А, тип Россия 
 Project 785 

River cruise ships
Ships of Russia
Ships of the Soviet Union